Buzin is a surname. Notable people with the surname include:

André Buzin (born 1946), Belgian artist
Rich Buzin (1946–2020), American football player